Harish Fabiani is a Madrid-based Non-Resident Indian (NRI) businessman.

Education 
He received his diploma in Electronics and Telecommunications Engineering in 1981 from Delhi University. In 1988, he completed an Executive Education program in Finance/General Corporate Management at Madrid IESE (Institute of Management for Superior Studies).

Career 
He is known as the pioneer of private equity financing in India. He is actively involved with technology companies, commercial real estate ventures, finance, and trading, and has been a strategic adviser to companies on issues of corporate governance and transparency. He also played a pivotal role in bringing José María Aznar, former Prime Minister of Spain, to India in September 2008 to initiate constructive communication with industrialists, businessmen and politicians in order to strengthen economic and political ties between the two nations.

Fabiani is the co-promoter of Americorp Ventures, his flagship company which has investments in a wide spectrum of industries. The Americorp Group, based in Madrid, has in excess of $2 billion of Fabiani family assets deployed in private equity, public markets and real estate in the EU and India. The company has been an early stage investor in Indian equities since 1997. It is behind several successful names of the Indian corporate circle - investments include Nimbus, AsiaNet Satellite Communications, TV18, Edelweiss Capital and Indiabulls. Transatlantic Corporation, a fund promoted by Fabiani, had invested $2 million in Indiabulls along with the Lakshmi Mittal-promoted LNM India Internet Ventures.

Additionally, Fabiani is the co-promoter of India Land, a real estate development company focused on commercial real estate in prominent Indian cities such as Chennai, Coimbatore, and Pune. India Land’s existing projects include Chennai Tech Park, a 2.4 million sq. ft. LEED gold-rated IT park in Ambattur, Chennai, a 1.9 million LEED gold-rated IT SEZ in Saravanampathi, Coimbatore and a 28-acre industrial park in Hinjewadi, Pune.

Personal life 
He is married to Roopa Fabiani.

References

External links

 Harish Fabiani investment in Indiabulls
 Americorp Group in subsidiary's website
 Nimbus Deal
 AsiaNet Deal
 Cbay Systems Investor Partners
 Frontline Strategy Team
 TOI Article

Living people
Businesspeople of Indian descent
Businesspeople from Madrid
Sindhi people
Year of birth missing (living people)